Nampa Christian Schools is a private K-12 Christian school in Nampa, Idaho.

New high school 
In January 2008 a new high school building was completed and occupied. Located on the corner of Midway and Flamingo the high school is approximately 2 miles from the previous campus which is still used by the elementary.

References

Christian schools in Idaho
Nampa, Idaho
Private high schools in Idaho
Schools in Canyon County, Idaho
Private elementary schools in Idaho
Private middle schools in Idaho